Haim Levy (born 1961) is an Israeli football manager and former player who manages Hapoel Ashdod.

Playing career
Levy started his career in the Hapoel Netanya. In the 1991–92 season he played for Hapoel Haifa and achieved promotion to the first division. In the 1992–93 season Levy played For Maccabi Ironi Ashdod and was promoted to the first division.

Managerial career
After retiring as a player, Levy became a manager. He managed Bnei Sakhnin in the First League in 2010.

He went on to manage clubs in the second division and in Liga Alef.

On 1 December 2016, Levy has been appointed coach of Maccabi Kiryat Gat of Liga Alef South.

References

External links
Haim Levy profile, In Israel Football Association

1961 births
Living people
Israeli Jews
Israeli footballers
Footballers from Netanya
Hapoel Netanya F.C. players
Hapoel Haifa F.C. players
Maccabi Ironi Ashdod F.C. players
Maccabi Kiryat Gat F.C. players
Israeli football managers
Hapoel Acre F.C. managers
Hapoel Ra'anana A.F.C. managers
Maccabi Herzliya F.C. managers
Hapoel Nir Ramat HaSharon F.C. managers
Bnei Sakhnin F.C. managers
Hapoel Beit She'an F.C. managers
Maccabi Ironi Kiryat Ata F.C. managers
Israeli Premier League managers
Association footballers not categorized by position